Ross Lindsey Iams (April 5, 1881 – March 25, 1952) was a United States Marine who received the Medal of Honor for actions in Haiti on November 17, 1915. Iams served for over 30 years in the Marine Corps, reaching the rank of major.  Iams is buried in Fort Rosecrans National Cemetery in San Diego, California.

Medal of Honor citation
Iams was awarded the Medal of Honor for actions while a sergeant in the U.S. Marine Corps.  His citation reads:

Following a concentrated drive, several different detachments of Marines gradually closed in on the old French bastion fort in an effort to cut off all avenues of retreat for the Caco bandits. Approaching a breach in the wall which was the only entrance to the fort, Sergeant Iams unhesitatingly jumped through the breach despite constant fire from the Cacos and engaged the enemy in a desperate hand-to-hand combat until the bastion was captured and Caco resistance neutralized.

Service time line
January 29, 1901 – enlisted in the Marine Corps
various brevets as Marine gunner, lieutenant and captain
June 4, 1920 – permanent appointment as captain, U.S. Marine Corps
November 1932 – retirement
January 19, 1942 – returned to active duty as major

See also

List of Medal of Honor recipients

References

External links

1881 births
1952 deaths
United States Marine Corps officers
United States Marine Corps personnel of World War I
United States Marine Corps personnel of World War II
People from Greene County, Pennsylvania
United States Marine Corps Medal of Honor recipients
Burials at Fort Rosecrans National Cemetery
Occupation of Haiti recipients of the Medal of Honor
Military personnel from Pennsylvania